Loyola College Gumilla is a coeducational school, primary through high school, founded by the Jesuits in 1965 in Puerto Ordaz, Ciudad Guayana, Bolivar State, Venezuela.

History
Loyola College Gumilla was opened by the Jesuits in 1965. In 1968 it moved to its present location and was given its present name. Since 1980 Loyola Gumilla has been coeducational from kindergarten. In 1978 the night school was added. By 1989 there were 1,727 students. The nuns of Cristo Rey withdrew from the College in 1980.

See also
 List of Jesuit schools

References

Jesuit schools in Venezuela
Educational institutions established in 1965
1965 establishments in Venezuela